Frauenstein is a town in the district of Sankt Veit an der Glan in the Austrian state of Carinthia.

Geography 
It is located directly northwest of Sankt Veit an der Glan in the hilly center of Carinthia. South of the community of Kraig is the Kraig Lake.

References

Cities and towns in Sankt Veit an der Glan District